Checkpoint kinase may refer to:
CHEK1, a protein kinase that is encoded by the CHEK1 gene
CHEK2, a tumor suppressor gene that encodes the CHK2 kinase